The Scunthorpe Mudstone is a geologic formation in England. It preserves plesiosaur fossils dating back to the Late Triassic (Rhaetian) to Early Jurassic (Hettangian) period. It predominantly consists of grey mudstone with thin beds of argillaceous limestone and calcareous siltstone. The Ichthyosaur Wahlisaurus is known from the formation. As is the holotype specimen of the dinosaur Sarcosaurus.

See also 
 List of fossiliferous stratigraphic units in England

References

Further reading 
 R. Forrest. 1998. A possible early elasmosaurian plesiosaur from the Triassic/Jurassic boundary of Nottinghamshire. Mercian Geologist 14(3):135-143

Geologic formations of England
Jurassic System of Europe
Triassic System of Europe
Jurassic England
Triassic England
Rhaetian Stage
Sinemurian Stage
Pliensbachian Stage
Hettangian Stage
Limestone formations
Geology of Nottinghamshire